The CAL (Carabine Automatique Légère, Light Automatic Rifle) was a Belgian weapon manufactured by Fabrique Nationale. It was the first 5.56 mm rifle produced by the Fabrique Nationale. It resembled the company's highly successful FN FAL, but was an original design. Unlike the FAL, it was a market failure, although its development led to the more successful FN FNC.

Design details
Prior to the development of the CAL, FN had already constructed a scaled-down FAL prototype before shelving the idea as unmarketable.  Noting the growing sales success of the cheaper and simpler HK G3 rifle, FN decided that for any future rifle to be competitive in the marketplace, it would need to use fewer expensive precision-machined parts. These would be replaced by less expensive castings and stampings where possible. While the construction of the new CAL reflected these design principles, it was still relatively expensive and complex, and met with no significant sales. It was eventually dropped for the even less expensive FN FNC. A small number of FN CALs were sold to the civilian market in the US.

Operation
Although the weapon resembled a scaled-down FN FAL, it in fact used a rotating bolt, unlike the FAL, which used a tilting bolt design. The earlier models of the CAL had a three-round selector system, which allowed the weapon to fire a three-round burst with each trigger pull. The CAL could also fire in fully and semi-automatic modes.

The gun used long stroke gas piston to operate the bolt carrier, and the bolt itself had interrupted lugs to lock it into the chamber.
Locking lugs were cut diagonally at a steep angle. So while the bolt is rotating to unlock, bolt face is slowly moving back, giving primary extraction of the case. Similar feature can be seen on MG-30, MG-15, MG-17 and MG-34.

Users

 
 : Karen National Liberation Army
 
 
 
 : Lebanese Forces (Militia)
 : People's Movement for the Liberation of Azawad
 
 : Gendamerie Royale
 
 : Royal Thai Police

For trials
 : Tested the CAL for consideration to the Imperial Iranian Army, but was never adopted.

 : Tested the CAL in the late 1960s and early 1970s for military adoption. It had a MAS 49/56 style rifle grenade launching system. But was never adopted.

See also
 FN FAL, 7.62mm NATO predecessor
 FN FNC, successor
 List of assault rifles

References

5.56 mm assault rifles
Assault rifles of Belgium
CAL
Trial and research firearms
Weapons and ammunition introduced in 1966